The King Must Die is the 2005 debut album by Australian indie rock band 26. It was released through Floodboy Records in July 2005. At the time, the band consisted of only two members: Nick O'Donnell and Drew Fellows. O'Donnell sampled and mixed the music from his previous band, Floodboy.

The album received national airplay, and was honoured as the feature album on FBi Radio's The Album Show.

Track listing

Personnel

26
Nick O'Donnell — lead vocals, guitar
Drew Fellows — keys, vocals
Iain Wilson — drums, vocals

Additional musicians
 Greg Cathcart — (track 2, 5 and 10)
 Andrew Doonican — (track 2, 5 and 10)
 Iain Wilson — (track 2, 5 and 10)
 Jonathan Shakhovskoy — vocals (track 10)
 Steve James — drums (track 5)

External links 
Official site for 26

References

2005 debut albums
26 (band) albums